USS Raleigh may refer to:

 was a 32-gun sailing frigate built in 1776 and captured by the British in 1778
 was a protected cruiser commissioned in 1894 and in periodic service until 1919
 was a light cruiser commissioned in 1924, active during World War II and sold for scrap in 1946
 was an amphibious transport dock in service from 1962 to 1992

See also
  
 
 

United States Navy ship names